Elizabeth Welborn (born 1 November 1998) is an Australian ironwoman and surf lifesaver.

References

1998 births
Australian female swimmers
Living people